Tres Quebradas is a corregimiento in Los Santos District, Los Santos Province, Panama with a population of 717 as of 2010. Its population as of 1990 was 1,646; its population as of 2000 was 665.

References

Corregimientos of Los Santos Province